Darae may refer to:

 Darae (fruit), a type of kiwi as used in Korean cuisine
 Da-rae, a Korean name
 Dara (Mesopotamia), or Darae, an ancient city of present-day Turkey

See also 
 Darai (disambiguation)